Table tennis at the 2010 Asian Games was held in Guangzhou Gymnasium, Guangzhou, China from November 13 to 20, 2010. Singles, doubles, and team events were held at Guangzhou Gymnasium.

China dominated the competition winning all seven gold medals.

Schedule

Medalists

Medal table

Participating nations
A total of 172 athletes from 29 nations competed in table tennis at the 2010 Asian Games:

References

 Individual Events Results
 Men's Team Event Results
 Women's Team Event Results

External links
Official site: Sports News.  Schedule and Results

 
2010
Asian Games
2010 Asian Games events
2010 Asian Games